The 1999 Badminton Asia Cup; officially called as JVC Asia Cup 1999 was the 2nd edition of the Badminton Asia Cup. It was held in Phan Đình Phùng indoor stadium, Ho Chi Minh City, Vietnam from 10 November to 14 November with total prize money of 100,000 US Dollars. Tournament consisted of total of three matches in every team encounter, with format of Men's singles, Men's doubles and a second Men's singles match. Countries participated in this tournaments were Indonesia, Malaysia, India, Thailand, South Korea, Chinese Taipei, Vietnam & China. Winning team & top seeded Indonesia got US$50,000 while runner-up Malaysian team got US$25,000. Third placed South Korean team got a total of US$15,000 and 4th ranked Chinese team bagged a total prize of US$10,000.

Group results

Group A 
1) South Korea V/s India

2) China V/s Vietnam

3) China V/s India

4) South Korea V/s Vietnam

5) China V/s South Korea

6) India V/s Vietnam

Group B 
1) Malaysia V/s Thailand

2) Indonesia vs Chinese Taipei

3) Malaysia V/s Chinese Taipei

4) Indonesia vs Thailand

5) Malaysia V/s Indonesia

6) Chinese Taipei V/s Thailand

Semifinals 
1) Indonesia V/s China

2) South Korea V/s Malaysia

Final 
Indonesia V/s Malaysia

Bronze medal tie 
South Korea V/s China

References 

Badminton tournaments in Asia
1999 in badminton
1999 in Vietnamese sport
Sport in Ho Chi Minh City
International sports competitions hosted by Vietnam
20th century in Ho Chi Minh City